The Bowers and McDonald Office Building is a historic structure located in Grinnell, Iowa, United States.  J.B. Bowers and M.W. McDonald had the building built as a speculative real-estate venture.  Its construction is attributed to R.G. Coutts, a native of Scotland who settled in Grinnell in 1873, who was a stone cutter, mason, building contractor, and real-estate developer.  Located in the city's central business district, it was one of the buildings constructed after a fire leveled a portion of the district in 1889.  The two-story, brick structure has a main facade of stone veneer, and features Richardsonian Romanesque styling.   It was listed on the National Register of Historic Places in 1991.

References

Office buildings completed in 1896
Richardsonian Romanesque architecture in Iowa
Grinnell, Iowa
Buildings and structures in Poweshiek County, Iowa
National Register of Historic Places in Poweshiek County, Iowa
Office buildings on the National Register of Historic Places in Iowa